Mandon Lake is a  lake located in White Lake Township of Oakland County in the U.S. state of Michigan. The geographic coordinates are 

The lake is affectionately known as the "Mighty Mandon", because despite its small size all sports are permitted.

See also
List of lakes in Michigan

External links
Mandon Lake Betterment Association

References

Lakes of Oakland County, Michigan
Lakes of Michigan